Bryan Cody Ransom (born February 17, 1976) is an American former professional baseball utility infielder and current infield coordinator for the Washington Nationals. He played for the San Francisco Giants, Houston Astros, New York Yankees, Philadelphia Phillies, Arizona Diamondbacks, Milwaukee Brewers, San Diego Padres, and Chicago Cubs of Major League Baseball.

Early life
Ransom was raised in Mesa, Arizona. He attended Chandler High School in Chandler, Arizona. He was selected by the Cleveland Indians in the 43rd round (1,202nd overall) in the 1995 Major League Baseball draft but did not sign with the Indians. He instead attended South Mountain Community College.

He was a survivor of a fatal van accident when his South Mountain Community College baseball team's van blew a tire on a team trip to Tucson, causing the van to roll over. Two of Ransom's teammates died.

After spending two years at South Mountain, Ransom spent the 1997 season at Mesa State, helping the Mavericks to the NCAA Division II regional. Ransom transferred to Grand Canyon University for the 1998 season, and was a key member of an Antelopes squad that won the Western Athletic Conference Northern Division. Ransom started every game at shortstop, hitting .330 with eight home runs and 48 RBIs while leading the team with 20 doubles.

Professional career

San Francisco Giants
Ransom was drafted again in 1998, this time by the San Francisco Giants in the ninth round (278th overall). After signing, he spent his first professional season with the Single-A Salem-Keizer Volcanoes.

Ransom made his major league debut on September 5, 2001, against the Arizona Diamondbacks. For the next three seasons from 2002 to 2004, he played for the Triple-A Fresno Grizzlies and the major league club. He was mainly used as a defensive replacement by the Giants. On August 8, 2003, he hit his first major league home run off Philadelphia Phillies starting pitcher Vicente Padilla.

Following the 2004 season, he was granted free agency by the Giants.

He was signed by the Chicago Cubs on January 20, 2005. On March 30, 2005, he was acquired by the Texas Rangers for cash considerations. He played for the Triple-A Oklahoma Redhawks and played in 24 games in which he batted .261 with five home runs. He was released on May 25, 2005. He re-signed with the Chicago Cubs two days later and played with the Triple-A Iowa Cubs for the rest of the season. He was granted free agency after the season.

Houston Astros
Ransom signed with the Seattle Mariners on January 27, 2006, with an invitation to Spring Training. He played in 19 games during Spring Training in which he batted .219 with no home runs. After being reassigned to minor league camp, he was acquired by the Houston Astros for cash considerations on March 30, 2006. He played for the Triple-A Round Rock Express for 2006 season. He batted just .247 with 21 home runs in 122 games.

He returned to the Round Rock Express for the 2007 season. He played for the Express until the end of the minor league season. Ransom batted .263 in 134 games and led the Express in home runs (28) and RBIs (90). He was also second on the team in hits with 131. His good performance earned him a call up on September 4, 2007.

On September 16, 2007, against the Pittsburgh Pirates, Ransom hit a home run off Paul Maholm. It was Ransom's first home run in the major leagues since 2004.

New York Yankees

Ransom signed a minor league contract with the New York Yankees before the 2008 season and was called up to the Yankees on August 15. He homered in both his first and second Yankee at bats, the first hitter in Yankee history to do so. The first occurred on August 17, 2008, against the Kansas City Royals; the second was on August 22, 2008, against the Baltimore Orioles.

On September 21, 2008, Ransom made the last putout in Yankee Stadium history. Baltimore Orioles second baseman Brian Roberts hit a slow ground ball down the first baseline that Ransom fielded, then stepped on first for the deciding out in a 7–3 Yankees win. On September 26, Ransom had his first multi-home run game against the Boston Red Sox. Both home runs came on the first pitch of the at bat. Ransom was one of only three Yankees to hit a home run while serving as a pinch hitter.

Ransom started the 2009 season as the Yankees' starting third baseman due to the hip surgery recovery of Alex Rodriguez; however, Ransom too was put on the disabled list on April 25 after an injury to his right quadriceps.  On August 5, 2009, Ransom was designated for assignment. He was released August 7, 2009, but re-signed with the Yankees to a minor league contract on August 10, and was assigned to the Triple-A Scranton/Wilkes-Barre Yankees. He was placed on the 7-day disabled list for an unknown injury on August 16, 2009.

Philadelphia Phillies
On December 11, 2009, Ransom signed a minor league contract with the Philadelphia Phillies. On July 3, 2010, the Phillies called him up to the majors after injuries to Chase Utley and Plácido Polanco. Ransom played in 22 games in July and August, making starts at third, second and first base. He had eight hits and two home runs in 42 at-bats. One of them was a game-tying home run with two outs in the bottom of the ninth inning against the Cincinnati Reds on July 7.

Arizona Diamondbacks
On January 19, 2011, Ransom signed a minor league contract with the Arizona Diamondbacks. On July 21, 2011, Ransom was called up from the Triple-A Reno Aces to replace an injured Stephen Drew. Ransom played in 12 total games at shortstop and third base in July and August. He elected free agency on October 10.

The Diamondbacks re-signed Ransom to a minor league contract on December 11. He again started the year in Reno, but was called up on April 18 when Chris Young went on the disabled list.  He made 13 starts at third base, hitting .269, before the Diamondbacks designated Ransom for assignment on May 21, 2012.

Milwaukee Brewers
On May 23, 2012, Ransom was claimed off waivers from the Arizona Diamondbacks by the Milwaukee Brewers.  On July 13, 2012, Ransom hit his first career grand slam against the Pittsburgh Pirates, lifting the Brewers to victory 10–7.  Ransom made 33 starts at shortstop, nine at third base, and two at second for the Brewers, hitting .196 with six home runs in 168 total at-bats.

Return to the Diamondbacks
On August 31, 2012, the Arizona Diamondbacks claimed Ransom off waivers from the Milwaukee Brewers.  He played in nine games for Arizona in September, making starts at shortstop and third and picking up seven hits in 23 at-bats.

San Diego Padres
On December 21, 2012, Ransom signed a minor league contract with the San Diego Padres.  With injuries to Chase Headley and Logan Forsythe in spring training, Ransom made his third Opening Day roster and second Opening Day line-up starting at third base. He was designated for assignment on April 12, 2013.

Chicago Cubs
Ransom was claimed off waivers by the Chicago Cubs on April 16, 2013. He was designated for assignment on September 8, 2013, and released on September 16.

Seibu Lions
Ransom signed a contract with the Seibu Lions of Nippon Professional Baseball for the 2014 season.

Coaching career
Ransom was hired by the Washington Nationals to serve as the team's infield coordinator for the 2023 season.

Personal life
Ransom is married to Ericka, and they have a daughter named Mackenzie and son named Jordan.  A 2009 YouTube video of his 60-inch box jump in a training session has received almost 400,000 hits.

References

External links

1976 births
Living people
American expatriate baseball players in Japan
Arizona Diamondbacks players
Bakersfield Blaze players
Baseball players from Arizona
Chicago Cubs players
Fresno Grizzlies players
Grand Canyon Antelopes baseball players
Houston Astros players
Iowa Cubs players
Lehigh Valley IronPigs players
Major League Baseball second basemen
Major League Baseball shortstops
Major League Baseball third basemen
Milwaukee Brewers players
New York Yankees players
Nippon Professional Baseball third basemen
Oklahoma RedHawks players
Philadelphia Phillies players
Reno Aces players
Round Rock Express players
Saitama Seibu Lions players
Salem-Keizer Volcanoes players
San Diego Padres players
San Francisco Giants players
Scranton/Wilkes-Barre Yankees players
Shreveport Captains players
Sportspeople from Mesa, Arizona
South Mountain Cougars baseball players
Colorado Mesa Mavericks baseball players